DCV Aegir is a deepwater construction vessel (DCV) owned by Heerema Marine Contractors and was christened during a festive ceremony in September 2013.

History
In December 2010, Heerema Marine Contractors announced that the Deep Water Construction Vessel being built in South Korea is to be named Aegir. Ulstein Sea of Solutions developed the vessel design as a customised version of the ULSTEIN SOC 5000 design. Huisman has provided the main crane, tower and reels. Auxiliary knuckle boom cranes are provided by Bergen Group Dreggen.

Design
The vessel is equipped for J-lay and reel pipelaying, with a payload of 4,500 metric tons. A crane has a lift capacity of 5,000 metric tonnes and lowering equipment can reach a depth of 3,500 meters. The vessel is equipped with class 3 dynamic positioning system.

The monohull is designed for fast transit speed and optimum motion characteristics in operation. The vessel can accommodate 289 persons.

External links
 Actual position, status, weather and other updates from DCV Aegir

Footnotes

Pipe-laying ships
Ships built by Daewoo Shipbuilding & Marine Engineering
2013 ships